Zehu Ze! (lit. This is it!) is a long-running Israeli entertainment television program, originally produced by Israeli Educational Television (IETV), and broadcast on the Israeli Channel 1 (until 1994) and on Channel 2. The program ran from 1978 to 1998, and was revived in 2020 by the IPBC (the successor to the IBA).

Undergoing several format changes during its lifetime, the program was originally promoted as a youth program, and was composed of several comedy segments. From the beginning of the 1980s, each episode focused on one subject. The original show's length was about one hour and was broadcast live. The original format included information segments, such as a Rock Music news segment presented by Yoav Kutner, and a riddle segment for the audience to answer by phone (the detective mystery riddles featuring Sefi Rivlin became iconic).

Episodes revolved around subjects related to life in Israel (for example fishermen and the decreasing water level of the Sea of Galilee, or an episode about the electric company), fads like Folk dancing, tributes to classics like Charlie Chaplin movies, or contemporary series like The Simpsons and Dallas. The phrase "Wa wa we wa" is popular in Israel and was used by British comedian Sacha Baron Cohen as Borat Sagdiyev.

Revival
In March 2020 IPBC announced plans to revive the show as COVID-19 pandemic Special Shows. The original hosts Shlomo Bar-Aba, Moni Moshonov, Gidi Gov, Doval'e Glickman and Avi Kushnir returned. The renewed format includes sketches on varying topics, and a closing song (usually a cover version for an Israeli classic) by the show's cast.

On July 23, 2020, the show was renewed for another season. As of June 2022, the show is into its fifth season in its revival format.

References

External links

 
 Zehu Ze!, on Kan Educational
 Zehu Ze! 2020, on Kan 11

Israeli television series
Israeli Educational Television
1978 Israeli television series debuts
1998 Israeli television series endings
1970s Israeli television series
1980s Israeli television series
1990s Israeli television series
2020s Israeli television series
2020 Israeli television series debuts
Kan 11 original programming
Television series revived after cancellation